The Segni II Cabinet was the 14th cabinet of the Italian Republic, which held office from 16 February 1959 to 26 March 1960, for a total of 404 days (or 1 year, 1 month and 10 days).

Composition

References

Italian governments
1959 establishments in Italy
1960 disestablishments in Italy
Cabinets established in 1959
Cabinets disestablished in 1960